The third season of the Albanian competitive reality television series Hell's Kitchen Albania premiered on October 2, 2020 on Top Channel. Renato Mekolli returned as host and head chef. Winner and Runner-up from season 2, Francesko Tuku and Visara Pirra became the sous chefs for the Red Team and Blue Team respectively.

On January 2, 2021, chef Renato announced Erkiada Konci as the winner; making her the first female contestant to win Hell's Kitchen Albania.

Chefs

Contestant progress

Team captains

References

External links

2020 Albanian television seasons
2021 Albanian television seasons
Hell's Kitchen (TV series)